Joseph Cassar (or Ġużè Cassar) (22 January 1918 – 27 November 2001) was a Maltese politician. 

Cassar graduated from the Bishop's Seminary in Gozo, and the University of Malta.

In 1976, Cassar won the deputy leader seat to Wistin Abela. He was Finance Minister of Malta from 1979 to 1981.

Related pages
List of Justice Ministers of Malta
List of Finance Ministers of Malta

References

1918 births
2001 deaths
Deputy Prime Ministers of Malta
Finance Ministers of Malta
Social affairs ministers of Malta
Labour Party (Malta) politicians 
20th-century Maltese politicians